General Coleman may refer to:

Charles Coleman (British Army officer) (1903–1974), British Army lieutenant general
Ronald S. Coleman (born 1948), U.S. Marine Corps lieutenant general

See also
Attorney General Coleman (disambiguation)